Annaluise and Anton (German: Pünktchen und Anton) is a 1953 Austrian-West German comedy film directed by Thomas Engel and starring Paul Klinger, Hertha Feiler, and Heidemarie Hatheyer. It was one of the 10 most popular films released in Austria that year.  It was made at the Sievering Studios in Vienna. The film's sets were designed by the art director Fritz Jüptner-Jonstorff. It was remade in 1999.

Main cast
 Sabine Eggerth as Pünktchen  
 Peter Feldt as Anton
 Paul Klinger as Herr Pogge  
 Hertha Feiler as Frau Eva Pogge  
 Heidemarie Hatheyer as Frau Gast, Anton's mother
 Annie Rosar as Bertha, cook
 Jane Tilden as Fräulein Andacht  
 Michael Janisch as Hollack, Chauffeur  
 Carl Möhner as Höllriegel, Rennfahrer  
 Claus Kaap as Klepperbein  
 Hugo Gottschlich as Gustav  
 Walter Varndal as Friseur Habekuss  
 Herbert Kroll as Lehrer Bremser  
 Maria Eis as Frau Übelmann  
 Carl de Groof 
 Hermann Erhardt as Ein Betrunkener  
 Curt Eilers as Polizei-Wachtmeister  
 Hans Putz as Robert
 Fritz von Friedl as Ein Schüler

References

Further reading 
 Fritsche, Maria. Homemade Men in Postwar Austrian Cinema: Nationhood, Genre and Masculinity. Berghahn Books, 2013.

External links 
 

1953 films
1953 comedy films
Austrian comedy films
German comedy films
West German films
1950s German-language films
Films directed by Thomas Engel
Films shot at Sievering Studios
Films based on works by Erich Kästner
Films based on children's books
Films based on German novels
Austrian black-and-white films
German black-and-white films
1950s German films